Neale Robert Thompson (born 2 February 1937) is a New Zealand former cricketer and badminton player. He played eighteen first-class matches for Otago between 1956 and 1963, and represented New Zealand at badminton.

Life and career
Thompson was born in Invercargill and educated there at Southland Boys' High School. A left-handed batsman, he played in the New Zealand Colts team in the mid-1950s. At the time, even before he had played first-class cricket, he was considered a future Test player. However, his eventual first-class career was moderate. He converted his only fifty into a century: 100 not out in Otago's victory over Northern Districts in December 1958. He played Hawke Cup cricket for Southland from 1954 to 1979; he opened the batting during Southland's long tenure as title-holders between March 1973 and February 1977.

Thompson also represented New Zealand at badminton. He won four New Zealand doubles titles and represented the country in five international series from 1958 to 1960.

Thompson met his wife, Fay, when they both represented Southland in badminton. They live in retirement in Winton, Southland.

See also
 List of Otago representative cricketers

References

External links
 

1937 births
Living people
New Zealand cricketers
Otago cricketers
Cricketers from Invercargill
People educated at Southland Boys' High School
South Island cricketers
New Zealand male badminton players